Thomas Hickman may refer to:

 Thomas Hickman (policeman) (1848–1930), New Zealand policeman
 Thomas Alexander Hickman (1925–2016), Canadian lawyer, politician and judge
 T. E. Hickman (Thomas Edgecumbe Hickman, 1859–1930), British Army officer and politician